The 2012–13 season is Bristol City's 111th season in the Football League. It is their 6th in the Football League Championship (Second Tier) since joining in 2007.

Bristol City had three kits this year, using last season's away kit (yellow and navy) as this year's third kit, however it was never used in the campaign.

League table

Squad

Statistics

|-
|colspan="14"|Players featured for club who have left:

Goalscorers

Disciplinary record

Fixtures and results

Pre-season

Championship

FA Cup

Football League Cup

Transfers

In

Loans in

Out

Loans out

Contracts

References

2012-13
2012–13 Football League Championship by team